The seagreen darter (Etheostoma thalassinum) is a species of freshwater ray-finned fish, a darter from the subfamily Etheostomatinae, part of the family Percidae, which also contains the perches, ruffes and pikeperches. It is found in the Santee River drainage of North and South Carolina. It inhabits rocky riffles of creeks and small to medium rivers.

References

Freshwater fish of the United States
Etheostoma
Fish described in 1878
Taxa named by David Starr Jordan
Taxa named by Alembert Winthrop Brayton